The Thai Society for the Prevention of Cruelty to Animals (TSPCA) is a Thai animal welfare organisation. The society was instrumental in the passing of Thailand's first animal welfare legislation, the Prevention of Animal Cruelty and Provision of Animal Welfare Act B.E. 2557 in 2014.

TSPCA objectives
 To instill in young people and the general public, a better understanding of animal needs and rights—encouraging a culture of kindness, care, and understanding
 To provide education, accurate information, guidance, and advice on animal care requirements 
 To campaign for the prevention of cruelty to animals, and for improved legislation for their protection 
 To work in collaboration with other organisations, governmental and private, in Thailand or internationally, in the achievement of similar aims 
 To support animal care-givers in their collective or individual work
 To work to conserve nature and the environment

To meet these objectives, the TSPCA has initiated a number of on-going projects.

See also 
 Animal welfare and rights in Thailand

References

External links 
 Thai SPCA
 Charity Thai

Animal welfare organizations based in Thailand
Animal charities
Charities based in Thailand